John Les (born 1951 or 1952) is a Canadian politician and former member of the Legislative Assembly (MLA) for British Columbia.  He has served as Parliamentary Secretary for Harmonized Sales Tax (HST) information, Minister of Small Business and Economic Development and Minister of Public Safety and Solicitor-General for the Provincial Government.

Les was a member of the Treasury Board and the Priorities and Planning Committee. He has chaired the Government Caucus, the Legislative Special Committee on the Citizens’ Assembly on Electoral Reform and  the Select Standing Committee on Aboriginal Affairs. He was a member of the Government Caucus Committee on Economy and Government Operations, the Select Standing Committee on Crown Corporations and the Select Standing Committee on Parliamentary Reform, Ethical Conduct, Standing Orders and Private Bills.

Les served as councillor from 1983 to 1987 and subsequently as mayor of Chilliwack from 1987 to 1999. Before entering politics, he was a partner in a Chilliwack dairy, a real estate agent and the owner of a land development company. He was elected in the 2001 B.C. election representing the British Columbia Liberal Party in the Chilliwack-Sumas riding. He won re-election in the 2005 B.C. election. He was re-elected in the newly created Chilliwack riding in the 2009 election.

On March 28, 2008, Les resigned from his position as Solicitor General pending the outcome of an investigation over allegations arising from his tenure as Mayor of Chilliwack. A special prosecutor was appointed to look into a land deal that he was alleged to have benefited from.

In June 2010, the investigation concluded with the special prosecutor stating there was no evidence to suggest that he used his public office to advance his personal interest.

On August 30, 2012, Les announced that he would not seek re-election as MLA for Chilliwack in the 2013 general election.

Election results (partial)

Federal

Provincial

Notes

External links

British Columbia Liberal Party MLAs
Candidates in the 1997 Canadian federal election
Year of birth missing (living people)
Living people
Members of the Executive Council of British Columbia
Mayors of Chilliwack
21st-century Canadian politicians
Liberal Party of Canada candidates for the Canadian House of Commons
Solicitors general of Canadian provinces